Michael Probst (born 11 November 1962) is a German former footballer who played as a goalkeeper. He played two Bundesliga games for Bayern Munich in the 1995–96 season, and was on the bench for the 1996 UEFA Cup Final.

References

External links
 

1962 births
Living people
German footballers
Association football goalkeepers
FC Bayern Munich footballers
FC Bayern Munich II players
TSV 1860 Munich II players
SpVgg Unterhaching players
Bundesliga players
UEFA Cup winning players
Türkgücü München players
Sportspeople from Trier
Footballers from Rhineland-Palatinate
West German footballers